The Norfolk and Suffolk Aviation Museum is a museum collection of aircraft and aviation-related artefacts, located near the former RAF Bungay airfield in Flixton in the north of the English county of Suffolk.

Details

First established in 1972 as the Norfolk and Suffolk Aviation Society, the museum houses a varied array of over 60 complete or partial aircraft, including rarities such as the only complete de Havilland Sea Vixen FAW.1 in private ownership, a flyable replica of the Colditz Cock escape glider, a Vickers Valetta VX580 C.2 and an FMA IA 58 Pucará that was captured by British forces during the Falklands War.

In addition to the aircraft displayed, the museum also houses thematic collections devoted to subjects including the Royal Observer Corps, RAF Bomber Command, air-sea rescue and RAF Coastal Command.

As well as preserving its existing collections, the museum and its members are actively involved in the exploration and study of aircraft crash sites – termed wreckology – in East Anglia. The museum charges no entrance fee and is entirely funded by public donations, corporate sponsorship, and local and European government grants. It employs only one full-time member of staff, with day-to-day maintenance and running of the museum falling largely on the shoulders of a team of volunteers.

Eminent autogyro exponent Wing Commander Ken Wallis had a long association with the museum, dating from shortly after its opening. For many years his Wallis WA-116 Agile autogyro, Little Nellie, made famous by its appearance in the 1967 James Bond film You Only Live Twice, was on display at Flixton. Wallis served as the museum's president until his death in September 2013.

See also
List of aerospace museums

References

External links

Norfolk and Suffolk Aviation Museum official website

Aerospace museums in England
Museums in Suffolk
1972 establishments in England
World War II museums in the United Kingdom